10245 Inselsberg, provisional designation , is a Gefion asteroid from the central regions of the asteroid belt, approximately  in diameter. It was discovered on 24 September 1960, by Ingrid and Cornelis van Houten at Leiden, and Tom Gehrels at Palomar Observatory in California, United States. The likely S-type asteroid was named for the German mountain Großer Inselsberg.

Orbit and classification 

Inselsberg is a member of the Gefion family, a large intermediate belt family, named after 1272 Gefion It orbits the Sun in the central asteroid belt at a distance of 2.5–3.0 AU once every 4 years and 8 months (1,695 days; semi-major axis of 2.78 AU). Its orbit has an eccentricity of 0.09 and an inclination of 9° with respect to the ecliptic. The body's observation arc begins with a precovery taken at Palomar Observatory in May 1954, or 6 years prior to its official discovery observation.

Palomar–Leiden survey 

The survey designation "P-L" stands for Palomar–Leiden, named after Palomar Observatory and Leiden Observatory, which collaborated on the fruitful Palomar–Leiden survey in the 1960s. Gehrels used Palomar's Samuel Oschin telescope (also known as the 48-inch Schmidt Telescope), and shipped the photographic plates to Ingrid and Cornelis van Houten at Leiden Observatory where astrometry was carried out. The trio are credited with the discovery of several thousand asteroid discoveries.

Physical characteristics 

As a member of the Gefion family, Inselsberg is likely a stony S-type asteroid. It has an absolute magnitude of 13.2. As of 2018, no rotational lightcurve of Inselsberg has been obtained from photometric observations. The body's rotation period, pole and shape remain unknown.

Diameter and albedo 

Based on a generic magnitude-to-diameter conversion, Inselsberg measures 6.9 kilometers in diameter for an assumed stony albedo of 0.20, derived from the Gefion family's standard albedo, and a measured absolute magnitude of 13.2.
According to the survey carried out by the NEOWISE mission of NASA's Wide-field Infrared Survey Explorer, Inselsberg measures kilometers in diameter and its surface has an albedo.

Naming 

This minor planet was named after Großer Inselsberg, a mountain with an altitude of  located in the Thuringian Forest in Thuringia, Germany. The official naming citation was published by the Minor Planet Center on 1 May 2003.

References

External links 
 Asteroid Lightcurve Database (LCDB), query form (info )
 Dictionary of Minor Planet Names, Google books
 Asteroids and comets rotation curves, CdR – Observatoire de Genève, Raoul Behrend
 Discovery Circumstances: Numbered Minor Planets (10001)-(15000) – Minor Planet Center
 
 

010245
Discoveries by Cornelis Johannes van Houten
Discoveries by Ingrid van Houten-Groeneveld
Discoveries by Tom Gehrels
6071
Named minor planets
19600924